Moussa Gueye (born February 20, 1989 in Dakar) is a Senegalese football player currently playing for Seraing United.

Career
On 27 November 2007 signed a four years contract with FC Brussels, but on 6 June 2008 left F.C. Molenbeek Brussels Strombeek and joined to Mons. On 16 June 2010 left Mons after two years in Mons, Belgium and signed with  Royal Charleroi SC.

International career
Gueye is former member of the Senegal national under-23 football team.

References

External links
 Profile - FC Metz

1989 births
Living people
Senegalese footballers
Senegalese expatriate footballers
R.A.E.C. Mons players
R. Charleroi S.C. players
R.W.D.M. Brussels F.C. players
Belgian Pro League players
Challenger Pro League players
Cheikh Anta Diop University alumni
FC Metz players
Ligue 1 players
Ligue 2 players
Associação Académica de Coimbra – O.A.F. players
Primeira Liga players
Expatriate footballers in Belgium
Expatriate footballers in France
Expatriate footballers in Portugal
Senegalese expatriate sportspeople in Belgium
Association football forwards
Footballers from Dakar